The League against Imperialism and Colonial Oppression was a transnational anti-imperialist organization in the interwar period. It has been referenced as in many texts as World Anti-Imperialist League or simply and confusingly under the misnomer Anti-Imperialist League.

It was established in the Egmont Palace in Brussels, Belgium, on February 10, 1927, in presence of 175 delegates from around the world. It was significant because it brought together representatives and organizations from the communist world and anti-colonial organizations and activists from the colonized world. 107 out of 175 delegates came from 37 countries under colonial rule. The Congress aimed at creating a "mass anti-imperialist movement" at a world scale. The organization was founded with the support of the Comintern. Since 1924, the Comintern advocated support of colonial and semi-colonial countries and tried, with difficulties, to find convergences with the left-wing of the Labour and Socialist International and with bourgeois anti-colonial nationalist parties from the colonized world. Another stimulus to create a cross-political cooperation was the revolutionary surge in China since 1923 in which the nationalist Kuomintang was in a United Front with the Chinese Communist Party.

According to Indian Marxist historian Vijay Prashad, the inclusion of the word 'league' in the organization's name was a direct attack on the League of Nations, which perpetuated colonialism through the mandate system.

At the 1955 Bandung Conference, Sukarno credited the League as the start of an eventually successful worldwide movement against colonialism.

1927 Brussels Conference 
The German communist and chair of the Workers International Relief Willi Münzenberg initiated the establishment of the League against Imperialism. To this end, he invited many personalities from European and American Left and anticolonial nationalists from the colonized world. Among those present in Brussels were emissaries of the Chinese Guomindang Party in Europe, Jawaharlal Nehru of the Indian National Congress, accompanied by Virendranath Chattopadhyaya, J.T. Gumede of the African National Congress (ANC) of South Africa, Messali Hadj of the Algerian North-African Star, and Mohammad Hatta of the Perhimpoenan Indonesia. Moreover, many activists from the European and American Left were present, such as Fenner Brockway, Arthur MacManus, Edo Fimmen, Reginald Bridgeman, and Gabrielle Duchêne, as well as intellectuals such as Henri Barbusse, Romain Rolland, and Albert Einstein.

Three main points were made in Brussels: the anti-imperialist struggle in China, interventions of the United States in Latin America and the "Negro revendications." The latter were presented at the tribune by the South African Gumede, the Antillean Max Clainville-Bloncourt of the Intercolonial Union, and Lamine Senghor. The president of the "Defense Committee of the Negro Race" denounced the crimes committed by the colonial administration in Congo, concluding that:
Imperialist exploitation has as result the gradual extinction of African races. Their culture is going to be lost... For us, the anti-imperialist struggle is identical as anti-capitalist struggle.

Messali Hadj, leader of the Algerian North-African Star, requested the independence of all of North Africa. A manifesto was addressed "to all colonial peoples, workers and peasants of the world" calling them to organize themselves to struggle "against imperialist ideology."

After the conference, Mohammad Hatta, who was also elected in the Executive Committee of the League said: “Our foreign propaganda in Brussels is the most important example of what we have done in this field so far." In September 1927 he was arrested by the Dutch authorities for sedition.

The conference saw conflict between representatives from organisations in Mandatory Palestine, Arab nationalist Jamal al-Husayni, Labour Zionist organisation Poale Zion, and the Palestine Communist Party (PCP). Bolshevik revolutionary Georgy Safarov angrily claimed that Zionism was a "British Imperialist Avant-Garde", which according to Israeli historian Jacob Hen-Tov reflected the Comintern's opposition towards Zionist activities in Palestine. After long deliberations by the Executive Council, the League ejected the Poale Zion delegation, with the PCP and Arab nationalists from Palestine, Egypt and Syria forming an anti-Zionist bloc for the vote.

The Cuban novelist Alejo Carpentier makes a small reference to this Congress in his novel Reasons of the State, in Chapter 7, Part 20. By a dialogue, in a train car, between the Cuban communist Julio Antonio Mella, who attended the Congress, and The Student, a comunista character in the novel.

1926–1931: difficulties 

The League against Imperialism was first ignored then boycotted by the Socialist International. Jean Longuet, a member of the French Section of the Workers' International (SFIO), criticized it, calling it "vague Sovietic chitchat" ("vague parlotte soviétique"). On April 12, 1927, as the Kuomintang armies of Chiang Kai-shek approached Shanghai, their allies carried out a massacre of Communists and workers. In December, the rightists crushed the Canton Commune. The alliance between Chiang Kai-shek's Nationalists and the Communist Party of China was terminated, sparking the Chinese Civil War, just as the struggle against the Japanese grew crucial, leading up to the invasion of Manchuria in 1931.

Moreover, the sixth Congress of the Comintern, in 1928, changed policy directions, denouncing "social-fascism" in what it called the "third period of the labour movement". The new "social-fascist" line weighed on the second Congress of the League, gathered in Frankfurt end of July 1929. 84 delegates of "oppressed countries" were present, and the Congress saw a bitter struggle between Communists and "reformist-nationalist bourgeois." Divided, the League was basically inoperative until 1935, when the seventh Congress of the Comintern decided to allow itself to dissolve. Nehru and Hatta had already been excluded, and Einstein, honorary president, had resigned because of "disagreements with the pro-Arab policy of the League in Palestine." In any cases, the League remained composed mainly of intellectuals, and did not succeed in finding popular support.

1932–1936: failure 

The French section never had more than 400 members (in 1932). In 1933, the League published the first issue (out of 13) of the Oppressed People's Newspaper, calls in favour of Tunisia in 1934 and of Ethiopia during the Abyssinian War (1935), which had few effects. The League was basically abandoned by the Communists. In 1935, the League pooled its resources with the World Committee of Women against War and Fascism (CMF: Comité mondial des femmes contre la guerre et le fascisme), (whose non-Communist sponsors in Britain included Sylvia Pankhurst and Charlotte Despard), and the West-African Union des Travailleurs Nègres, to protest repression throughout the European colonial empires.

The League remained the first attempt at an international anti-imperialist organization, a brief later assumed by the Non-Aligned Movement and the Organization of Solidarity with the People of Asia, Africa and Latin America headed by Moroccan leader Mehdi Ben Barka.

See also 
 World Committee Against War and Fascism 
 All-America Anti-Imperialist League
 Non-Aligned Movement

References 

 Green, John, Willi Münzenberg - Fighter against Fascism and Stalinism, Routledge 2019
 The League Against Imperialism: Lives and Afterlives edited by Michele Louro, Carolien Stolte, Heather Streets-Salter and Sana Tannoury-Karam, Leiden University Press, 2020.

External links
 League against Imperialism Archives at the International Institute of Social History

Anti-imperialism
Comintern
History of colonialism